Livin' in a Hoe House is the only studio album by American female rap group H.W.A. The album was released in 1990 via Drive-By Records and was produced by Dangerous D and Ronnie Vann. The record was mildly successful, reaching #38 on the Top R&B/Hip-Hop Albums chart. No singles made it to the Billboard charts.

The song "Eat This" was later sampled in "Black Widow Pt. 2" as performed by RZA and Ol' Dirty Bastard from the album Digital Bullet (2001).

Track listing

Samples

"Funk Me" sampled
"Raid" by Lakeside (1983)
"Pee-Wee's Dance" by Joeski Love (1986)
"Everlasting Bass" by Rodney-O & Joe Cooley (1988)
"Eat This" sampled
"Sir Nose D'Voidoffunk" by Parliament (1977)
"Pussy Ain't Nothin'" by Schoolly D (1989)
"Livin' in a Hoe house" sampled
"Funky Drummer" by James Brown (1970)
"Funky President (People It's Bad)" by James Brown (1974)
"Freaky Daze" sampled
"Freaky Tales" by Too Short (1987)
"Change the Beat (Female Version)" by Beside (1982)
"Gangstrology" sampled
"I'm Gonna Get You" by Sir Joe Quarterman & Free Soul (1974)
"Funky Drummer" by James Brown (1970)
"Change the Beat (Female Version)" by Beside (1982)
"Funky President (People It's Bad)" by James Brown (1974)
"Hobo Scratch" by Malcolm McLaren and World's Famous Supreme Team (1983)
"Trick Is a Trick" sampled
"Anti Love Song" by Betty Davis (1973)
"Funky Drummer" by James Brown (1970)
"The Conflict" sampled
"School Boy Crush" by Average White Band (1975)
"It's a New Day" by Skull Snaps (1973)
"Get Up Offa That Thing" by James Brown (1976)
"Nasty" sampled
"(Nothing Serious) Just Buggin'" by Whistle (1986)

Personnel

Kim "Baby Girl" Kenner - vocals, rapping
Tanya "Jazzy" Kenner - vocals, rapping
Dion "Diva" Devoux - vocals, rapping
Beth Chaplin - background vocals
Budd Ford - background vocals
Cheri Ford - background vocals
Lenore Bangs - background vocals
Livio Harris - background vocals
Robin Warnecke - producer, drum programming
Ronald Dean Vann - producer
James Cedrick Magee - keyboards, drum programming
Damon Thomas - keyboards, drum programming
Jason Hess - keyboards, drum programming
Nutra-Sweet - keyboards, drum programming
Muhammad Azam Zia - mixing
Dave Sheidene - mixing, engineering
Anne Catalino - engineering
Muhammad Azam Zia - engineering
Sugar Daddy T. - executive producer
Pete Lascurain - project & production coordinator
Ronnie Richardson - project coordinator & marketing
Paula Kuhn - project coordinator
Mark Hovater - photography
Gayle Elliot - photography

References

H.W.A. albums
1990 debut albums